Johannes Ursprung (born 3 February 1991) is a German lightweight rower. He won a gold medal at the 2016 World Rowing Championships in Rotterdam with the lightweight men's quadruple scull.

References

External links

1991 births
Living people
German male rowers
World Rowing Championships medalists for Germany
21st-century German people